Legia Warszawa, known in English as Legia Warsaw, is a Polish amputee football club founded in 2019 as a section of the Legia Warsaw sports club. The team was created as a result of the transformation of Gloria Varsovia, existing since 2016, which existed after the dissolution of Lampart Warsaw.

History 
At the end of April 2019, Legia took part in the beginning of the new season of Amp Futbol Ekstraklasa as the defender of the championship won by Gloria Varsovia. In the first league tournament, played in Płońsk, they took third place.

In May, the team started the competition in the first edition of the EAFF Champions League. On the first day of tournament, Legia defeated Everton 2–1, and then lost to Ortotek Gaziler S.K. 0–5 and finally finished second in the group. On 26 May 2019, in the semi-finals, they lost 1–4 against the champions of Russia, Dinamo Altai, and in the match for the third place, Polish team won 3–2 against Irish Cork City.

In 2020, Legia won their first Polish championship, winning 14 out of 16 matches in the season.

References

External links 
Official website

Legia Warsaw
Parasports teams
Sports teams in Poland
Amputee football
Disability organisations based in Poland